Édouard Butin (born 13 June 1988) is a French professional footballer who plays as a striker.

Career
Butin made his professional debut for FC Sochaux-Montbéliard on 14 September 2008 in a Ligue 1 game against Lille OSC. Butin is a France youth international.

In July 2017, Butin joined Stade Brestois 29. He left Brest at the end of the 2018–19 season, and after six months without a club he signed a six month contract with US Orléans in December 2019. He left at the end of the contract, and spent another six months without a club, until ASM Belfort signed him on a short term deal in December 2020, despite French amateur football being temporarily suspended due to COVID-19.

Career statistics

References

External links
 

1988 births
Living people
Association football forwards
French footballers
France youth international footballers
Ligue 1 players
Ligue 2 players
Championnat National 2 players
Championnat National 3 players
Dijon FCO players
FC Sochaux-Montbéliard players
Valenciennes FC players
Stade Brestois 29 players
US Orléans players
ASM Belfort players
People from Dole, Jura
Sportspeople from Jura (department)
Footballers from Bourgogne-Franche-Comté